Baghdad Street is a street in Kampong Glam, Singapore.  Like nearby Arab Street, the name of the street reflects the Arabic influence in that area of Singapore.  It is lined with traditional shophouses.

Roads in Singapore